Mnombo Zwelendaba (born 21 February 2000) is a South African rugby union player for the  in the Currie Cup. His regular position is centre.

Zwelendaba was named in the  side for the 2022 Currie Cup Premier Division.

References

South African rugby union players
Living people
Rugby union centres
Stormers players
Western Province (rugby union) players
2000 births
Rugby sevens players at the 2018 Summer Youth Olympics